Parachrostia is a genus of moths of the family Erebidae erected by Michael Fibiger in 2008.

Species
Parachrostia yoshimotoi Fibiger, 2008
Parachrostia sugii Fibiger, 2008
Parachrostia kishidai Fibiger, 2008
Parachrostia owadai (Sugi, 1982)
Parachrostia pura Fibiger, 2011

References

Micronoctuini
Noctuoidea genera